ACC Asian XI cricket team was a team that took part in World Cricket Tsunami Appeal and Afro-Asia Cup. The ACC Asian XI played their first in a one-off match the 2005 World Cricket Tsunami Appeal which was designed to raise funds for charities following the 2004 Indian Ocean earthquake and resulting tsunami. As of now, Asia XI had played 7 matches, the Asian XI have won 4 of them.

The team also competed in an Afro-Asia Cup against an Africa XI which was designed as a fund-raiser for the African Cricket Association and the Asian Cricket Council. The Afro-Asian Cup debuted in 2005 and the second tournament was played in 2007.

History

1999/00 ICC Cricket Week 
Asia XI and Rest of the world XI played a one Match series on 8 April 2000 as a part of 1999/00 ICC Cricket Week.

Squad

Scorecard

Tsunami Appeal Match 

Their first match resulted in a heavy 112 run loss to the World XI in the Tsunami Appeal match at Melbourne Cricket Ground. Travelex sponsored the first match, which was a 78,000 sell-out, for A$1 million. Two C-130H Hercules aircraft, similar to those used by the Royal Australian Air Force to carry supplies to regions devastated by the massive earthquake and resulting tsunamis, flew over the MCG during the break between innings.

The first ODI, which the World XI won by 112 runs, raised approximately A$17 million, while original estimations suggested only A$5 million would be raised from the Australians. The games were designated as One Day Internationals by the ICC, the first time a game between teams not representing separate cricketing nations was so designated. This designation attracted criticism from cricket statisticians.

Squad

Scorecard

2005 Afro-Asia Cup 

Afro-Asia Cup was an idea to raise money for the Asian Cricket Council and the African Cricket Association and the whole venture was given a massive boost when the ICC somewhat controversially agreed to give the series of one-day matches full ODI status.

They went on to lose the opening match of the 2005 Afro-Asian Cup by two runs to the African XI. They bounced back and won the next match, however, including half centuries for each of the Sri Lankan pair Kumar Sangakkara and Mahela Jayawardene. During the deciding match, the Asian XI bowled the African XI out for 106, but soon after starting their batting performance rain fell and the game was called off: the trophy was shared.

Squad

2007 Afro-Asia Cup 

In the 2007 competition, the Asian XI recorded a 3–0 whitewash of the Africans – winning the first two matches by 34 and 31 runs (respectively), the latter helped by Dilhara Fernando recording ODI career best bowling figures of 4/36. In the final match, the Asians fell to 72/5, but following centuries from Mahela Jayawardene (107) and Mahendra Singh Dhoni (139*) – the latter being the highest individual score ever recorded in an Afro-Asia Cup match – they posted a score of 331/8. Despite half-centuries from three of the African batsmen, however, the Asian XI won by 13 runs.

Mahela Jayawardene is the highest run-scorer of the Asian XI in the Afro-Asia Cup, with two half-centuries and a century to his name, second to Shaun Pollock, and was named Man of the Series for the 2007 competition. Zaheer Khan tops the list for most wickets with 11.

Squad

See also 
 List of Asia XI ODI cricketers
 List of Asia XI Twenty20 International cricketers
 :Category:Multi-national teams in international cricket

References

External links 
Asian Cricket Council
Cricinfo
World Cricket Tsunami Appeal tour subpage
Afro-Asian Cup 2005 tour subpage
Afro-Asia Cup 2007 tour subpage
CricketArchive
World Cricket Tsunami Appeal tour subpage
Afro-Asia Cup 2005 tour subpage
Afro-Asia Cup 2007 tour subpage

Asian XI ODI
Cricket
Cricket in Asia